Hollywood Private Hospital (Hollywood) is an acute care hospital located in Nedlands, Western Australia. Hollywood is Western Australia's largest private hospital, with more than 900 licensed beds. The hospital is part of Ramsay Health Care Group and has more than 800 accredited specialists working across a wide range of disciplines including cardiology, gastroenterology, general medicine, general surgery, oncology, orthopaedics, palliative care, psychiatry, rehabilitation and urology. Hollywood employs over 2,000 people and has 75,000 patient admissions each year.

Specialties
Hollywood offers a wide range of comprehensive specialties, including  
aged care and rehabilitation,  
bariatric/obesity surgery,  
cardiology,  
cardiology – interventional,  
colorectal surgery,  
dermatology,  
ear nose and throat,  
endocrinology,  
gastroenterology,  
general medicine,  
general surgery,  
gynaecological oncology,  
gynaecology,  
haematology,  
infectious diseases,  
neurology,  
neurosurgery,  
nuclear medicine,  
oncology,  
orthopaedics,  
paediatric surgery,  
pain medicine,  
palliative care,  
plastic and reconstructive surgery,  
psychiatry,  
rehabilitation,  
renal medicine,  
respiratory,  
rheumatology,  
urology and  
vascular surgery.

History 
1942 - 110 Military Hospital
1947 - Repatriation General Hospital, Hollywood; Jean Elsie Ferguson, matron
1994 - Purchased by the Ramsay Health Care Group and commenced operations as Hollywood Private Hospital on 24 February 1994
1997 - Opening of The Hollywood Clinic
2002 - Opening of Sylvia Perry Wing containing the John Carroll and Clifford Sadlier Wards
2009 - Opening of Marjorie Brislee Wing containing the Hugh Edwards, Leslie Starcevich, Mark Donaldson, Percival Gratwick and George Gosse Wards
2016 - Opening of Anne Leach Wing containing the Jim Gordon, Stan Gurney and George Howell Wards
2020 - The Hollywood Clinic Expansion
2021 - Opening of the Hollywood Consulting Centre

Building 
The hospital contains four wings: the Anne Leach Wing, Marjorie Brislee Wing, Vivian Bullwinkel Wing and the Sylvia Perry Wing. 

All wards and units are named after Western Australians who were awarded the Victoria Cross and George Cross:
Charles Pope Ward (Victoria Cross)
Clifford Sadlier Ward (Victoria Cross)
Frederick Bell Unit (Victoria Cross)
George Gosse Ward (George Cross)
Henry Murray Ward (Victoria Cross)
Hugh Edwards Ward (Victoria Cross)
Jim Gordon Ward (Victoria Cross)
James Woods Ward (Victoria Cross)
John Carroll Ward (Victoria Cross)
Lawrence McCarthy Ward (Victoria Cross)
Leon Goldsworthy Ward (George Cross)
Leslie Starcevich Ward (Victoria Cross)
Martin O'Meara Ward (Victoria Cross)
Percival Gratwick Ward (Victoria Cross)
Stan Gurney Ward (Victoria Cross)
Thomas Axford Ward (Victoria Cross)
Mark Donaldson Ward (Victoria Cross)
The Hollywood Clinic has the following:
 Fenwick Day Unit - named after Ethel Gordon Fenwick 
 THC Edis - named after Dot (Margaret Dorothy) Edis
 THC Ferguson - named after Jean Ferguson
 THC Nickoll - named after Molly (Emily Mary) Nickoll

See also
Repatriation General Hospital

References

External links

Ann Whyntie, History, 2001, Occupational Therapy Australia WA, retrieved 3 March 2009.
Opening of the Hollywood Private Hospital Extension, 24 July 2002, Speech by The Hon Danna Vale MP, Minister for Veterans’ Affairs, retrieved 3 March 2009.
A History of Caring, ramsayhealth.com.au, retrieved 3 March 2009.
Hollywood Private Hospital, School of Surgery, University of Western Australia

Hospitals in Perth, Western Australia
Hospitals established in 1942
Nedlands, Western Australia
1942 establishments in Australia